Diego Souza (born 11 September 2002) is a Brazilian professional footballer who plays as a midfielder for USL League One club New England Revolution II via the New England Revolution academy.

Career

Youth
Souza joined the New England Revolution academy from Valero FC in 2018. In 2020, Souza spent time with the club's USL League One affiliate team New England Revolution II. He made his debut on 29 August 2020, appearing as a 71st-minute substitute during a 4–0 loss against Chattanooga Red wolves.

References

2002 births
Brazilian footballers
Brazilian expatriate footballers
Expatriate soccer players in the United States
Association football midfielders
Living people
Soccer players from Massachusetts
New England Revolution II players
USL League One players
People from Hyannis, Massachusetts
Sportspeople from Barnstable County, Massachusetts